Ben Anderson Barrage forms part of the Bundaberg Irrigation Scheme, and is located in the Wide Bay–Burnett region of Queensland, Australia, near the towns of Bundaberg, Gin Gin, and Childers. It is composed of water storages, a channel distribution system, and a state government-developed irrigation area. Storages in this part of the scheme include Ben Anderson Barrage Walla Weir and Bingera Weir.

References

Wide Bay–Burnett
Dams in Queensland
Reservoirs in Queensland